Hai Phong Port (cảng Hải Phòng) is a port group in Haiphong City, Vietnam, serving Northern Vietnam and future Kunming-Lao Cai-Hanoi-Haiphong Corridor. This is the leading seaport for northern Vietnam, and there are plans for the port system to handle ships up to 30,000-40,000 DWT. The new port will be known as Lach Huyen, and its construction will involve the creation of an island linked by a bridge to the mainland. There will be a new bulk terminal and three container terminals.

References

Buildings and structures in Haiphong